William De Witt Snodgrass (January 5, 1926 – January 13, 2009) was an American poet who also wrote under the pseudonym S. S. Gardons. He won the 1960 Pulitzer Prize for Poetry.

Life
Snodgrass was born on January 5, 1926, in Beaver Falls, Pennsylvania, to Bruce De Witt, an accountant, and Jesse Helen (Murchie) Snodgrass. The family lived in Wilkinsburg, but drove to Beaver Falls for his birth since his grandfather was a doctor in the town. Eventually the family moved to Beaver Falls and Snodgrass graduated from the local high school in 1943. He then attended Geneva College until 1944 when he was drafted into the United States Navy. After demobilization in 1946, Snodgrass transferred to the University of Iowa and enrolled in the Iowa Writers' Workshop, originally intending to become a playwright but eventually joining the poetry workshop which was attracting as teachers some of the finest poetic talents of the day, among them John Berryman, Randall Jarrell and Robert Lowell. He received a Bachelor of Arts degree in 1949, a Master of Arts degree in 1951, and a Master of Fine Arts degree in 1953.

Snodgrass was known to friends throughout his life as "De", pronounced "dee", but only published using his initials. He had a long and distinguished academic career, having taught at Cornell (1955-7), Rochester (1957-8), Wayne State (1959–68), Syracuse (1968–1977), Old Dominion (1978-9), and the University of Delaware. He retired from teaching in 1994 to devote himself full-time to his writing. This included autobiographical sketches, essays, and the critical verse "deconstructions" of De/Compositions. He died in his home in Madison County, New York, aged 83, following a four-month battle with lung cancer, and was survived by his fourth wife, writer Kathleen Snodgrass.

Snodgrass had married his first wife, Lila Jean Hank, in 1946, by whom he had a daughter, Cynthia Jean. Their marriage ended in divorce in 1953 and it was the separation from his daughter as a result that became the subject of his first collection, Heart's Needle. The following year Snodgrass married his second wife, Janice Marie Ferguson Wilson. Together they have a son, Russell Bruce, and a stepdaughter, Kathy Ann Wilson. Divorcing again in 1966, he married his third wife, Camille Rykowski in 1967 but this ended in 1978. His fourth marriage to Kathleen Ann Brown was in 1985.

Literary career
Snodgrass's first poems appeared in 1951, and throughout the 1950s he published in some of the most prestigious magazines: Botteghe Oscure, Partisan Review, The New Yorker, The Paris Review and The Hudson Review. However, in 1957, five sections from a sequence entitled "Heart's Needle" were included in Hall, Pack and Simpson's anthology, New Poets of England and America, and these were to mark a turning-point. When Lowell had been shown early versions of these poems, in 1953, he had disliked them, but now he was full of admiration.

By the time Heart's Needle was published, in 1959, Snodgrass had already won The Hudson Review Fellowship in Poetry and an Ingram Merrill Foundation Poetry Prize. However, his first book brought him more: a citation from the Poetry Society of America, a grant from the National Institute of Arts, and, most important of all, 1960's Pulitzer Prize in Poetry. It is often said that Heart's Needle inaugurated confessional poetry. Snodgrass disliked the term. The genre he was reviving here seemed revolutionary to most of his contemporaries, reared as they had been on the anti-expressionistic principles of the New Critics. Snodgrass's confessional work was to have a profound effect on many of his contemporaries, amongst them, most importantly, Robert Lowell.

Being tagged with this label affected his work and its reception and forced him into small-press publication for many years. Two new themes (eventually) restored his reputation, although at the time they first began to appear there was a perception by some that Snodgrass had "wrecked his career". One was The Führer Bunker cycle of poems, monologues by Adolf Hitler and his circle in the closing days of the Third Reich, a "poem in progress" that began to appear from 1977 onwards and was finally completed in 1995. An adaptation of these for the stage was performed in the 1980s. The other theme was the series written in response to DeLoss McGraw's surrealistic paintings, which eventually grew into a partnership. In these poems, often uproariously rhymed, Snodgrass stood his former confessional style on its head at the same time as satirizing contemporary attitudes.

Bibliography
Poetry
 1959: Heart's Needle
 1968: After Experience: Poems and Translations
 1968: Leaving the Motel
 1970: Remains
 1977: The Führer Bunker: A Cycle of Poems in Progress
 1979: If Birds Build with Your Hair
 1981: These Trees Stand
 1982: Heinrich Himmler
 1983: The Boy Made of Meat
 1983: Magda Goebbels
 1984: D. D. Byrde Callying Jennie Wrenn
 1986: The Kinder Capers
 1986: A Locked House
 1987: Selected Poems: 1957-1987
 1988: W. D.'s Midnight Carnival
 1989: The Death of Cock Robin
 1993: Each in His Season
 1995: The Führer Bunker: The Complete Cycle
 2006: Not for Specialists: New and Selected Poems

Prose
 In Radical Pursuit: Critical Essays and Lectures (1975)
 After-images: autobiographical sketches (1999)
 To Sound Like Yourself: Essays on Poetry (2002)

Drama
The Führer Bunker (1981)

Anthologies
 Gallows Song (1967)
 Six Troubadour Songs (1977)
 Traditional Hungarian Songs (1978)
 Six Minnesinger Songs (1983)
 The Four Seasons (1984)
 Five Romanian Ballads, Cartea Romaneasca (1993)
 Selected Translations (1998) (Harold Morton Landon Translation Award)
 De/Compositions: 101 Good Poems Gone Wrong (2001)

Sources
W. D. Snodgrass (Twayne's United States authors series; TUSAS 316) by Paul L. Gaston
The Poetry of W. D. Snodgrass: Everything Human (Under Discussion) by Stephen Haven (Editor)
No music, no poem: Interviews with W.R. Moses & W.D. Snodgrass by Roy Scheele
W.D. Snodgrass: A bibliography by William White
Tuned and Under Tension: The Recent Poetry of W.D. Snodgrass (edited by Philip Raisor)
W.D. Snodgrass and The Führer bunker: an interview, Gaston
The First Confessionalist, an interview with Ernest Hilbert in Contemporary Poetry Review 
An examination of "Discourses on the apostolical succession, by W.D. Snodgrass, D.D by William Johnson
American Writers: A Collection of Literary Biographies, Supplement Vi, Don Delillo to W. D. Snodgrass, edited by Jay Parini
Everything Human: On the Poetry of W. D. Snodgrass by Richard Howard

References

External links
A note on W D Snodgrass

Ernest Hilbert interview with W.D. Snodgrass.
W.D. Snodgrass video at Web of Stories
  Michael Foldes, W.D. Snodgrass, Memoir, Ragazine.CC at  

1926 births
2009 deaths
American male poets
Formalist poets
Cornell University faculty
Deaths from lung cancer in New York (state)
Geneva College alumni
Members of the American Academy of Arts and Letters
Pulitzer Prize for Poetry winners
University of Iowa alumni
Writers from Pittsburgh
Iowa Writers' Workshop alumni
Translators to English
20th-century American poets
20th-century translators
20th-century American male writers
United States Navy personnel of World War II